Coles is a locality  in the Australian state of South Australia located in the state's south-east within the Limestone Coast region about  south east of the state capital of Adelaide and about  south-west of the municipal seat of Naracoorte.

Boundaries for the locality were created and was given the name of Coles on 3 December 1998. The name is derived from the cadastral unit of the Hundred of Coles in which the locality is located.  The hundred itself was named after Jenkin Coles who was a member of the South Australian House of Assembly from 1875 to 1911.

The 2016 Australian census which was conducted in August 2016 reports that Coles had a population of 39 people.

Coles is located within the federal division of Barker, the state electoral district of MacKillop and the local government area of  the Naracoorte Lucindale Council.

In January 2022 a bushfire burning within the locality resulted in the death of a CFS volunteer Louise Hincks.

References

Limestone Coast